Quesada is a district of the San Carlos canton, in the Alajuela province of Costa Rica. It is the head city of the canton of San Carlos. Although Ciudad Quesada is the official name, it is commonly referred to by the area name of San Carlos. Ciudad Quesada is also the most populous city in the canton of San Carlos.

The city is the economic and political center of the region, especially for the agricultural and dairy industries. The Quesada district and its surrounding areas produce about 65% of all milk in Costa Rica.

Geography 
Quesada has an area of  km2 and an elevation of  metres. It is located at the foot of the Cordillera Central (Central Mountain Range) on the southern edge of the San Carlos Plain, an expansive lowland that forms a major part of the Caribbean slope in northern Costa Rica. It is 79 km northwest of the provincial capital city of Alajuela and 90.9 km from the national capital city of San José.

History
The city was first called La Unión, which was later changed to Villa Quesada. Villa Quesada was granted the title of "Ciudad" (City) by law on July 8, 1953.

Demographics 

For the 2011 census, Quesada had a population of  inhabitants.

Transportation

Road transportation 
The district is covered by the following road routes:
 National Route 140
 National Route 141
 National Route 748

Economy
The city is a major commercial center for ranching and agricultural enterprises in the surrounding area. It is known for its leather goods, as well as for its dairy production. The city harbours some important manufacturing plants related to the agribusiness sector.

This city harbors facilities of Costa Rica's largest dairy cooperative in order to produce cheese and powder milk. It also has a R&D center operating in the same facilities Dos Pinos.

Tourism
There are several hot springs in the area, some of which have developed into resorts, attracting  Costa Ricans and foreign tourists.

Nearby places of interest
Zoológico La Marina is a private nonprofit zoo operated by the Alfaro family on five hectares of their cattle ranch. There are more than 450 species of animals and birds on display, most of which were confiscated by the government from illegal private ownership. The facility also maintains a successful breeding program of tapirs, an increasingly endangered species. It is 11 kilometers northeast of Ciudad Quesada on the road to Aguas Zarcas.

Sports
The town's football club is A.D. San Carlos, who have spent over 25 years in the Costa Rican Primera División. They play their home games at the Estadio Carlos Ugalde Álvarez.

See also
 Canton of San Carlos
 District of Florencia
 District of Buenavista
 District of Aguas Zarcas
 District of Venecia
 District of Pital
 District of La Fortuna
 District of La Tigra
 District of La Palmera
 District of Venado
 District of Cutris
 District of Monterrey
 District of Pocosol
 List of districts of Costa Rica

References

External links 
 

Districts of Alajuela Province
Populated places in Alajuela Province